Carleton was an electoral district that elected members to the Legislative Assembly of New Brunswick (now a province of Canada) from 1824 to 1974.  Its boundaries were those of Carelton County and the number of members it returned varied over the years.

It was abolished in the 1973 electoral redistribution when the province moved to single member districts; at the time it elected three members and it was split into three single member districts: Carleton North, Carleton Centre and Carleton South.

During its time, three premiers represented the riding: James Kidd Flemming, Hugh John Flemming and Richard Hatfield.

Members of the Legislative Assembly

Election results

Notes

Former provincial electoral districts of New Brunswick
1974 disestablishments in New Brunswick